Novosibirsky (masculine), Novosibirskaya (feminine), or Novosibirskoye (neuter) may refer to:
Novosibirsky District, a district of Novosibirsk Oblast, Russia
Novosibirsky (rural locality), a rural locality (a settlement) in Krasnoyarsk Krai, Russia
Novosibirsk Oblast (Novosibirskaya oblast), a federal subject of Russia
Novosibirskoye, a rural locality (a selo) in Sakhalin Oblast, Russia